"By the Bend of the River", also known as "By the Bend in the River", is a song by Clara Edwards. Published in 1927, it was featured on the soundtrack of the 1930 feature film Symphony in Two Flats starring Ivor Novello. Operatic soprano Grace Moore recorded the song in 1934, and Etta Jones included it on her 1962 album From the Heart. Jazz singer Betty Carter had a strong affinity for the song. She recorded it three times, first on her 1958 studio album Out There, and later on two live albums, Betty Carter at the Village Vanguard and Round Midnight.

The song is sometimes credited to "Bernard (or Bernhard) Haig", a pen name Edwards used.

1927 songs